The University of Cagliari is a university in Cagliari, Sardinia, Italy. It was founded in 1606 and is organized in 11 faculties.

History
The Studium Generalis Kalaritanum was founded in 1606 along the lines of the old Spanish Universities of Salamanca, Valladolid and Lleida, but it begins to operate only after the privilege of King Philip III in 1620. as Universidad y Estudio General de Caller en el Reyno de Cerdeña (University and Gener Study of Cagliari in the Kingdom of Sardinia). It originally offered Law, Latin, Greek and Hebrew Literature, the Liberal Arts, Medicine, Surgery, Philosophy and Science. When Sardinia passed under the House of Savoy government in the 18th century, the statute of the university was significantly modified, with the expansion of the science faculties and institutes. Designed by the Piedmontese engineer Saverio Belgrano di Famolasco, the new university building was completed at the end of the 18th century. Today it hosts the Rectorate and the administrative offices. The 19th and 20th centuries saw more and more emphasis placed on research activities, with the achievement of important, internationally acclaimed results, especially in the fields of medicine, physics, chemistry, biology and archaeology. In the 20th century, problems arising from severe damage to University buildings during the Second World War had to be dealt with, and reconstruction is only just now approaching its final phase. At the end of the 1960s, ambitious plans were advanced for Anglo-Saxon types of residential university structures in a single body.

Today, the great dream has come true: a new university campus on the outskirts of town. The new campus is situated in Monserrato, on an area of 73 hectares. It hosts the science faculties, many departments with their respective faculties, and one of the university general hospitals, adequately integrated with other medical institutions.

Organization
There are the 11 faculties in which the university is divided into:

 Faculty of Economical, Giuridical and Political Sciences
 Faculty of Humanistic Studies
 Faculty of Engineering and Architecture
 Faculty of Medicine and Surgery
 Faculty of Biology and Pharmacy
 Faculty of Sciences
The university has about 36,000 enrolled students, a teaching staff of over 1,200 and a technical-administrative staff of about 1,300 people. University students of Cagliari manage a webradio UnicaRadio.it.

At the moment the University of Cagliari is one of the largest enterprises in the Region of Sardinia, thanks to its international policy, studies and its numerous agreements with prestigious universities in Europe and around the world.

Corporate placement and campus drive 
University provides vide network of corporate placement opportunities for its students and recently collaborated internationally with TreeAndHumanKnot a giving first ideology of RisingIndia ThinkTank for international opportunity for its students. This became first major collaboration for the university in India

Radio
The Unica Radio project was born within the University on 8 October 2007, that is, a university radio run by students belonging to the RadUni association also transmits in DAB+

Coat of arms
The coats of arms of this university are, in the middle, the image of the Very Saint Conception, and at the foot a tiara of Pontiff with letter H that means the name of Saint Hylarius Pope, and below, two Prelate Mitres, in the one on the right hand, a letter L which means the name of Saint Lucifer with Primatial Cross, and in the other hand, the letter E which means the name of Saint Eusebius with his pastoral insignia, and then at the right side of the Virgin, the coats of arms of this Kingdom (of Sardinia), and at left side, the one of this city of Cagliari''.

Notable faculty
Among its notable faculty were:

 Corrado Gini, statistician, developer of the Gini Coefficient
 Nicola Abbagnano, philosopher
 Giulio Angioni, writer and anthropologist
 Enrico Bombieri, mathematician
 Giuseppe Brotzu, pharmacologist
 Aldo Capitini, philosopher and politician
 Ernesto de Martino, anthropologist
 Oliviero Diliberto, politician and jurist
 Ludovico Geymonat, philosopher
 Pietro Ichino, politician and jurist
 , philosopher and historian
 Beppo Levi, mathematician
 Doro Levi, archaeologist
 Giovanni Lilliu, archaeologist
 Eva Mameli, botanist
 Antonio Pacinotti, physicist
 , philosopher
 Guido Tabellini, economist

Points of interest
 Orto Botanico dell'Università di Cagliari, the university's botanical garden

See also

 List of early modern universities in Europe
 List of Italian universities
 Cagliari

References

External links
 Official Website 

 
University of Cagliari
Educational institutions established in the 1600s
Buildings and structures in Sardinia
Education in Sardinia
1606 establishments in Italy